Kiki Bertens and Johanna Larsson were the defending champions, but lost in the quarterfinals to Andreea Mitu and Alicja Rosolska. 

Mitu and Rosolska went on to win the title, defeating Lesley Kerkhove and Lidziya Marozava in the final, 6–3, 7–5.

Seeds

Draw

External Links
 Main Draw

Swedish Open - Doubles
2016 Women's Doubles
2016 in Swedish women's sport